Laura Shaughnessy (born 19 June 1990) is an Irish long-distance runner.

She competed in the women's half marathon at the 2018 IAAF World Half Marathon Championships held in Valencia, Spain. She finished in 79th place.

References

External links 
 

Living people
1990 births
Place of birth missing (living people)
Irish female long-distance runners